Fort Patrick Henry Dam is a hydroelectric dam on the South Fork Holston River within the city of Kingsport, in Sullivan County in the U.S. state of Tennessee.  It is the lowermost of three dams on the South Fork Holston owned and operated by the Tennessee Valley Authority, which built the dam in the early 1950s to take advantage of the hydroelectric potential created by the regulation of river flow with the completion of Watauga Dam, South Holston Dam, and Boone Dam (which were primarily flood control structures) further upstream in preceding years.  The dam impounds the  Fort Patrick Henry Lake.  While originally built for hydroelectric generation, the dam now plays an important role in the regulation of water flow and water temperature for the John Sevier Fossil Plant and other industrial plants downstream.  The dam and associated infrastructure were listed on the National Register of Historic Places in 2017.

Fort Patrick Henry Dam is named for a Revolutionary War-era fort once located at nearby Long Island of the Holston.

Location

The city center of Kingsport is just northwest of the dam, and the unincorporated community of Colonial Heights is also nearby. Warriors' Path State Park occupies part of Fort Patrick Henry Lake's shoreline.

Capacity

Fort Patrick Henry Lake extends  up the South Fork Holston to the base of Boone Dam and has  of shoreline. The dam is not operated for flood-storage capacity.

Background and construction

Public and private entities were aware of the hydroelectric potential of the South Fork Holston River by the early 1900s, when the Watauga Power Company built Wilbur Dam (completed 1912) on the river's Watauga River tributary.  In the 1920s, the Holston River Power Company conducted a large-scale survey of the South Fork Holston with plans to build four dams along the river and market the dams' electrical power to nearby cities.  Around the same time, the U.S. Army Corps of Engineers proposed building a dam at the "Pactolus site", roughly a mile downstream from the present Fort Patrick Henry Dam site.  When the Tennessee Valley Authority gained oversight of flood control operations in the area in the 1930s, they identified the present dam site (which they initially called the "Wexler Bend site") as more favorable.  TVA's completion of Watauga Dam and South Holston Dam and the impending construction of Boone Dam in 1950 would regulate the river's flow in such a manner as to make a downriver hydroelectric project feasible.  Work on Fort Patrick Henry Dam began on May 14, 1951.

The dam was completed and its gates closed October 27, 1953. The dam's first generator went online December 5, 1953 and its second generator went online February 22, 1954. The total cost of the Fort Patrick Henry project was $12.3 million.

References

External links

Fort Patrick Henry Reservoir — official TVA site
Fort Patrick Henry Reservoir — Tennessee Wildlife Resources Agency

Holston River
Dams in Tennessee
Tennessee Valley Authority dams
Kingsport, Tennessee
Hydroelectric power plants in Tennessee
Buildings and structures in Sullivan County, Tennessee
Dams completed in 1953
Energy infrastructure completed in 1953
Dams on the National Register of Historic Places in Tennessee
National Register of Historic Places in Sullivan County, Tennessee